Angaria sphaerula, common name Kiener's delphinula, is a species of sea snail, a marine gastropod mollusc of the family Angariidae.

Description
The shell ranges in length from 30 to 100 mm.

Like other species of Angaria, A. sphaerula is highly ornamented, with the shape of its ornaments varying from spikes to fronds. The ornaments are often quite large. This species tends to be a mix of light green and pinkish-red in color. The interior of the shell is pearlescent.

Distribution
This species can be found in the Philippines and parts of the western Pacific Ocean.

References

 Günther R. (2016). Angaria neocaledonica n. sp. - A new species of Angariidae from New Caledonia (Mollusca: Gastropoda). Conchylia. 46(1-4): 89-96
 Poppe G.T. & Goto Y. (1993) Recent Angariidae. Ancona: Informatore Piceno. 32 pls, 10 pls.

External links 

Angariidae
Gastropods described in 1838